Straits View is a planning area located in the Central Area of the Central Region of Singapore. The area is currently relatively undeveloped, with fewer commercial developments compared to the adjacent Downtown Core.

Straits View planning area is bounded by Marina South to the north, the Downtown Core to the northwest and west, and the Singapore Strait to the south.

References

 
Central Region, Singapore
Places in Singapore